Jing'an Sculpture Park, or Jingan Sculpture Park, is a sculpture park in the Jing'an District of Shanghai, China.

Works
 Colors of Happiness
 Elemental Spring: Harmony
 Flying Colors
 Girouette Monumentale
 Horse
 Large Parrot Screams Color
 Music Power
 Ostrich Hide and Seek
 Red Beacon
 Urban Fox

See also

 Shanghai Natural History Museum

References

External links
 

Jing'an District
Parks in Shanghai
Sculpture gardens, trails and parks in China